
Gmina Kęty is an urban-rural gmina (administrative district) in Oświęcim County, Lesser Poland Voivodeship, in southern Poland.

Villages
Apart from the town of Kęty, Gmina Kęty contains the villages and settlements of Bielany, Bulowice, Łęki, Malec, Nowa Wieś and Witkowice.

Neighbouring gminas
Gmina Kęty is bordered by the town of Oświęcim and by the gminas of Andrychów, Brzeszcze, Kozy, Osiek, Oświęcim, Porąbka, Wieprz and Wilamowice.

References
Polish official population figures 2006

Kety
Oświęcim County